Kupriyanov is a Russian masculine surname derived from the given name Ciprian. Its feminine counterpart is Kupriyanova. It may refer to
Aleksandr Kupriyanov (born 1952), Russian football player
 Ludmila Kupriyanova (1914–1987), Russian palynologist 
Mikhail Kupriyanov (born 1973), Russian football player

See also
Kupriyanov Islands

Russian-language surnames
Patronymic surnames
Surnames from given names